Flesh and Blood (stylized as Flesh+Blood) is a 1985 romantic historical adventure film directed by Paul Verhoeven, and starring Rutger Hauer, Jennifer Jason Leigh, Tom Burlinson, Susan Tyrrell, Ronald Lacey, Bruno Kirby and Jack Thompson. The script was written by Verhoeven and Gerard Soeteman. The story is set in the year 1501 in Italy, during the early modern period, and follows two warring groups of mercenaries and their longstanding quarrel.

The script is partly based on unused material for the Dutch TV series Floris, which was the debut for Verhoeven, Soeteman and Hauer. The film, originally titled God's Own Butchers, was also known as The Rose and the Sword on early VHS releases. It was Verhoeven's first English-language film.

The film follows a group of mercenaries who carry out missions for a lord who has lost his castle but after retaking it they are betrayed and forced to leave.  During a revenge attack the group find and take a young woman who is betrothed to the lord's son.  This changes the dynamic of the group during a dangerous time of medieval fighting and the plague.

The film was a huge box office flop, only managing to make back 100,000 out of its estimated 6.5 million budget.

Plot 
In 1501, a city in Italy has been taken by a coup d'état while its rightful ruler, Arnolfini, is away. Arnolfini promises some mercenaries 24 hours of looting if they succeed in retaking the city, and they do so, raping and killing those who stand in their way. But in their revelry, Arnolfini decides that he wants the mercenaries gone.

Hawkwood, the commander of the troops, is caring for a young nun he mistakenly attacked during the siege. Arnolfini promises to get medical attention for her, while Hawkwood leads Arnolfini's cavalry, betraying his former lieutenant, Martin. The cavalry ejects the mercenaries from the city without their loot. Soon after, Martin's son is stillborn. Burying the infant unearths a wooden statue of Saint Martin of Tours—a saint with a sword. The mercenaries' cardinal views this as a sign from God to follow Martin as their new leader.

Arnolfini's son Steven is betrothed to Agnes. They meet for the first time and eat from a mandrake to magically fall in love, and later the entourage is attacked and robbed by Martin's band. Arnolfini is seriously injured; Kathleen, Agnes' lady-in-waiting, is stabbed in the chest and dies; and Agnes is hauled away, concealed among her valuable dowry. Martin discovers Agnes later that evening as they strip the caravan of valuables. The men desire to rape her but Martin decides to take her himself. He rapes Agnes in front of the caravan while she at first taunts him to humiliate him, and then begs Martin's protection when he's finished. Martin prevents the rest of the men from raping her.

The mercenaries come upon a castle where, unknown to them, the inhabitants are infected with the plague. They capture the castle easily with the help of Agnes. She induces Martin to fall in love with her and works on the other mercenaries to accept her. She appears to have given up on her former life. Meanwhile, Steven is determined to rescue her and turns to Hawkwood. Hawkwood only wants to live a quiet life, married to the former nun he had injured. Steven, becoming as ruthless as his father, seizes the nun to force Hawkwood to help his pursuit of Martin.

Steven's party locates Martin and the mercenaries. They do not have sufficient force to take the castle and lay siege to it. In the castle, Martin asks Agnes where her true loyalty lies; she is noncommittal, hinting that the winner takes all. Outside, the plague spreads among Steven's forces and infects Hawkwood. Steven builds a siege tower to storm the castle, and Martin destroys it with something Steven had tried earlier: gunpowder. Steven's soldiers are killed as Steven scales the tower's ladders, and he falls into the castle grounds. 

The mercenaries capture Steven and shackle him in the courtyard; Agnes joins in the abuse of the captive Steven. Using a new medical technique Steven had learned (cutting the buboes on the infected body), Hawkwood cures his plague. He cannot continue the siege alone but, before leaving for additional troops, he catapults pieces of an infected dog into the castle. One chunk lands near the chained Steven; he initially warns Martin of the danger of the dog, but flings it into the castle's water well after seeing Agnes acquiesce to Martin's sexual demands. Steven tells her that she can decide whether to tell the mercenaries.

The mercenaries wish to leave the castle, fearing the plague, but Martin persuades them to stay. At the next meal, Agnes watches as they drink infected water. As Martin begins to drink, she slaps the cup from his hand, just as the mercenaries begin to show signs of the plague. The party blame Martin, and hurl him into the well. As she did after Steven's capture, Agnes joins in the abuse of Martin.

After the throng departs, Steven needs Martin's key to escape from the shackles, and Martin needs Steven to get out of the well. The two cooperate, but upon seeing that Hawkwood and Arnolfini have recovered from their wounds and have returned with an army, Martin flees to the belfry. Steven frees himself and, as the battle rages, races to find Agnes. During the fighting, the belfry catches fire. Before long, all the mercenaries but Martin, Polly, Anna, and Little John are dead.

Martin confronts Agnes. She claims that she loves him, but he prepares to murder her rather than allow her to return to Steven. As Martin is strangling Agnes, Steven attacks. Martin overpowers Steven and almost drowns him, but Agnes strikes Martin on the head, and she and Steven flee the blazing castle and reunite with Hawkwood. As Agnes and Steven embrace, Agnes sees Martin over Steven's shoulder, escaping from the castle, a sack of loot on his shoulder. She says nothing.

Cast 
 Rutger Hauer as Martin, mercenary leader
 Jennifer Jason Leigh as Agnes, virgin daughter of an aristocrat
 Tom Burlinson as Steven, learned son of Arnolfini
 Jack Thompson as Hawkwood, a captain of mercenaries
 Fernando Hilbeck as Arnolfini, feudal lord
 Susan Tyrrell as Celine, a drunken prostitute attached to Martin
 Ronald Lacey as Cardinal, a visionary
 Brion James as Karsthans, a mercenary
 Bruno Kirby as Orbec, a mercenary
 Simon Andreu as Miel, a mercenary
 John Dennis Johnston as Summer, a mercenary
 Marina Saura as Polly, a prostitute
 Kitty Courbois as Anna
 Jake Wood as Little John, Anna's son
 Nancy Cartwright as Kathleen, Agnes's lady-in-waiting
 Héctor Alterio as Niccolo
 Blanca Marsillach as Clara
 Jorge Bosso as Sterz
 Mario De Barros as Herman
 Hans Veerman as Father George, a physician
 Ida Bons as Roly Poly
 Jaime Segura as Lord of the Castle
 Bettina Brenner as Lady of the Castle
 Siobhan Hayes as Child of the Castle
 Susan Beresford as Sturdy Woman
 Mònica Lucchetti as Tongueless Girl
 Anne Lockhart as Wife

Production 
After tiring of attempting to have his controversial Dutch films subsidized by the government, Verhoeven looked elsewhere for funding for Flesh and Blood, eventually securing most of the budget from Hollywood studio Orion Pictures. However, Orion soon requested changes, feeling that the film needed a love interest; thus, instead of focusing on the relationship between Hawkwood and Martin, Agnes was introduced and attention turned to her romantic entanglement with both Martin and Steven. Verhoeven later said: "The triangular relationship [of] Martin–Agnes–Steven is now the main story line, but in retrospect I think we should have stuck with Hawkwood and Martin. The failure of Flesh and Blood was a lesson for me: never again compromise on the main story line of a script."

In addition to a cast featuring American, Australian, British and Dutch actors, attempting to handle an international co-production funded by multiple sources who all wanted to take the film in different directions overwhelmed Verhoeven, who had also not storyboarded the film in a bid to achieve a "looser visual approach". There were a number of delays and disagreements because of the subsequent improvisational style of filming; many members of the cast and crew also arrived and left when they pleased to party on a local beach. One of the most notable disagreements was between Verhoeven and Hauer, who wanted to cultivate a reputation for playing heroic characters rather than villains, as he did in Ridley Scott's Blade Runner (1982). This was at odds with Verhoeven's intent to portray the moral ambiguity of its characters and the Middle Ages as a "stinking time in which to live" to distance it from typical medieval fantasy depictions of the period. This caused a bitter rift to develop between the two, who did not work together again.

Some of the film was censored, including the rape sequence. This upset Jennifer Jason Leigh, who was opposed to censorship. "It's a hard scene to watch," she said. "Brutal and ugly as rape is, I know it's going to upset a lot of people. But the film is extraordinary. Paul Verhoeven is so gifted."

Flesh and Blood was shot in Spain, in Belmonte (Cuenca), Cáceres and Ávila.

Flesh and Bloods musical score was composed by Basil Poledouris, conducting the London Symphony Orchestra. La-La Land Records released an extended CD of the score in 2013 with almost twice as much music as the original 1985 LP/CD release by Varèse Sarabande.

Release
Though the film received worldwide release in the summer of 1985, in the United States, Orion Pictures gave the film a limited theatrical release on August 16, 1985, in Los Angeles and New York City. Thus, the film did not gross a large amount in the country, and by most accounts, performed poorly. By 1986, the film was showing in the U.S. on HBO, a business partner of Orion Pictures.

Reception

Box office
Verhoeven has hypothesized on the reasons for the film's failure at the American box office in the years since its release, including statements that it was "too cynical and downbeat" to be a hit. Professor of film and literature at California Polytechnic State University Douglas Keesey suggested that the film had "no hero to root for and no happy fantasy element to lighten its unpleasantly realistic depiction of the Middle Ages".

The film's financial failure caused Verhoeven to move to the United States in September 1985 in order to better understand American culture and what films would be suited to its audience. In addition to this, his previous films, notably Spetters (1980), had been protested by members of the Dutch public and it had become difficult to gain financing to shoot productions in his home country.

Critical response

Although unsuccessful at the box office upon release, the film has become a critical and cult favorite. It maintains an 86% approval rating on the review aggregator Rotten Tomatoes based on 21 reviews, with a weighted average of 6.1/10.

Noel Murray of The A.V. Club wrote in his review: "From the start of his career, Dutch director Paul Verhoeven has mostly focused on making violent, sexy genre pieces—often punishing, often absurd, and always placed in the context of a moralistic pessimism. Verhoeven’s 1985 English-language film debut Flesh and Blood wallows in mud and misery, with Rutger Hauer playing an early-16th-century mercenary who leads a troupe of undesirables in a revolt against a deadbeat lord, and Jennifer Jason Leigh playing a virginal lady who’s kidnapped by the rebels and becomes Hauer’s (mostly) willing mate."

Cultural impact 
The movie inspired Berserk creator Kentaro Miura, who said in a 2003 interview when he won the Tezuka Osamu Cultural Prize's Award for Excellence (2002) that he based the design of Berserk protagonist Guts on the character Martin as portrayed by actor Rutger Hauer.

References

Citations

Sources

External links 
 
 
 
 

1985 films
1980s adventure films
1980s historical drama films
1980s English-language films
English-language Dutch films
English-language Spanish films
American historical drama films
Films about mercenaries
Films scored by Basil Poledouris
Films directed by Paul Verhoeven
Orion Pictures films
Films set in castles
Films set in the 1500s
Films set in Italy
Dutch historical drama films
Spanish historical drama films
Films shot in the province of Ávila
Films shot in the province of Cuenca
Films shot in the province of Cáceres
Films about coups d'état
1980s American films